A German Akademie is a school or college, trade school or another educational institution. The word Akademie (unlike the words Gymnasium or Universität) is not protected by law, and any school or college may choose to call itself Akademie. A Sommerakademie (Summer Akademie) is a programme that teaches different groups of children or grown-ups, usually during the summer month. Sometimes those programmes are remedial in nature.

Origin of the word 

The word Akademie derives from the Platonic Academy, which was located near the bosk of Akademos.

Examples of Akademies 

Akademie deutsches Bäckerhandwerk Weinheim
Akademie für musische Bildung und Medienerziehung
Akademie der Künste
Akademie der bildenden Künste

References

Education in Germany
Adult education
School types